Late Fragment is a 2007 Canadian interactive cinema production, written and directed by Daryl Cloran, Anita Doron and Mateo Guez. It is North America's first interactive feature film. The project is a co-production of Canadian Film Centre and the National Film Board of Canada.

Plot
Three strangers lives are fractured by thoughts and acts of seething violence. In this interactive feature film, viewers unravel their interlocked stories with a simple click.

Festivals
Late Fragment had its world premiere at the 2007 Toronto International Film Festival and screened next at Montreal's Festival du Nouveau Cinéma.

References

External links
 The making of Late Fragment
 Late Fragment Directors Admit Their Film Inspires Strong Reactions
 

2007 films
English-language Canadian films
National Film Board of Canada films
Canadian avant-garde and experimental films
Interactive films
Canadian Film Centre films
2000s interactive fiction
2000s avant-garde and experimental films
2000s English-language films
2000s Canadian films